Adrián Cuneo (1912–1995) was an Argentine film actor. He co-starred with the comedian Niní Marshall in a number of films.

Selected filmography
 Four Hearts (1939)
 Flecha de oro (1940)
 The Tango Star (1940)
 Mother Gloria (1941)
 Tomorrow I'll Kill Myself (1942)
 Amor último modelo (1942)
 En el último piso (1942)
 An Evening of Love (1943)
 Carmen (1943)

References

Bibliography 
 Ann Davies & Phil Powrie. Carmen on Screen: An Annotated Filmography and Bibliography. Tamesis Books, 2006.

External links 
 

1912 births
1995 deaths
Argentine male film actors